Holcocranum saturejae is a species of true bug in the family Artheneidae. It is found in Africa, Europe and Northern Asia (excluding China), and North America.

References

Further reading

 

Lygaeoidea
Articles created by Qbugbot
Insects described in 1845